Hugo Edlund (1883–1953) was a Swedish cinematographer active during the silent and early sound eras. He worked frequently with the film director John W. Brunius.

Selected filmography
 Thora van Deken (1920)
 The Mill (1921)
 A Wild Bird (1921)
 A Fortune Hunter (1921)
 The Eyes of Love (1922)
Iron Will (1923)
 Johan Ulfstjerna (1923)
 A Maid Among Maids (1924)
 Charles XII (1925)
 The Tales of Ensign Stål (1926)
 Only a Dancing Girl (1926)
 Gustaf Wasa (1928)
 Artificial Svensson (1929)
 Cavaliers of the Crown (1930)
 Love and the Home Guard (1931)
 Colourful Pages (1931)
 His Life's Match (1932)
 Love and Dynamite (1933)

References

Bibliography
 Klossner, Michael. The Europe of 1500-1815 on Film and Television: A Worldwide Filmography of Over 2550 Works, 1895 Through 2000. McFarland & Company, 2002.
 Sadoul, Georges. Dictionary of Film Makers. University of California Press, 1972.

External links

1883 births
1953 deaths
Swedish cinematographers